Gerand may refer to:
 John Garand, the designer of the M1 U.S. Army rifle
 Gerund, an element of syntax in grammar